Aethes sulphurosana is a species of moth of the family Tortricidae. It was described by Kennel in 1901. It is endemic to Algeria.

References

sulphurosana
Endemic fauna of Algeria
Moths of Africa
Moths described in 1901
Taxa named by Julius von Kennel